The men's 5000 metres competition at the 2022 European Speed Skating Championships was held on 8 January 2022.

Results
The race was started at 15:28.

References

Men's 5000 metres